India is the second most populated country in the world with a sixth of the world's population. According to official estimates in 2022, India's population stood at over 1.4 billion. According to UN forecasts, in 2023 India will overtake China and become the most populous country in the world.  

Between 1975 and 2010, the population doubled to 1.2 billion, reaching the billion mark in 2000. India is projected to surpass China to become the world's most populous country by 2023. It is expected to become the first country to be home to more than 1.5 billion people by 2030, and its population is set to reach 1.7 billion by 2050. However, its pace of population growth is slowing.  In 2017 its population growth rate was 0.98%, ranking 112th in the world; in contrast, from 1972 to 1983, India's population grew by an annual rate of 2.3%.

In 2022, the median age of an Indian was 28.7 years, compared to 38.4 for China and 48.6 for Japan; and, by 2030;      India's dependency ratio will be just over 0.4. However, the number of children in India peaked more than a decade ago and is now falling. The number of children under the age of five peaked in 2007, and since then the number has been falling. The number of Indians under 15 years old peaked slightly later (in 2011) and is now also declining.

India has more than two thousand ethnic groups, and every major religion is represented, as are four major families of languages (Indo-European, Dravidian, Austroasiatic and Sino-Tibetan languages) as well as two language isolates: the Nihali language, spoken in parts of Maharashtra, and the Burushaski language, spoken in parts of Jammu and Kashmir. 1,000,000 people in India are Anglo-Indians and 700,000 United States citizens are living in India. They represent over 0.1% of the total population of India. Overall, only the continent of Africa exceeds the linguistic, genetic and cultural diversity of the nation of India.

The sex ratio was 944 females for 1000 males in 2016, and 940 per 1000 in 2011. This ratio has been showing an upwards trend for the last two decades after a continuous decline in the last century.

History

Prehistory to early 19th century
The following table lists estimates for the population of India (including what are now Pakistan and Bangladesh) from prehistory up until 1820. It includes estimates and growth rates according to five economic historians, along with interpolated estimates and overall aggregate averages derived from their estimates.

Estimates of historical world population

The population grew from the South Asian Stone Age in 10,000 BC to the Maurya Empire in 200 BC at a steadily increasing growth rate, before population growth slowed down in the Early Medieval Era up to 700 AD, and then started decreasing the  up to 1500 AD.

Under Mughal Empire, India experienced a high economic and demographic upsurge, due to Mughal agrarian reforms that intensified agricultural production. 15% of the population lived in urban centres, higher than the percentage of the population in 19th-century British India and contemporary Europe up until the 19th century. Those estimates were criticised by Tim Dyson, who considers them exaggerations. According to Dyson, urbanisation of the Mughal empire was less than 9%

Under the reign of Akbar (reigned 1556–1605) in 1600, the Mughal Empire's urban population was up to 17 million people, larger than the urban population in Europe. By 1700, Mughal India had an urban population of 23 million people, larger than British India's urban population of 22.3 million in 1871. Nizamuddin Ahmad (1551–1621) reported that, under Akbar's reign, Mughal India had 120 large cities and 3,200 townships. A number of cities in India had a population between a quarter-million and half-million people, with larger cities including Agra (in Agra Subah) with up to 800,000 people and Dhaka (in Bengal Subah) with over 1 million people. Mughal India also had a large number of villages, with 455,698 villages by the time of Aurangzeb (reigned 1658–1707).

Late 19th century to early 20th century 
The total fertility rate is the number of children born per woman. It is based on fairly good data for the entire years. Sources: Our World in Data and Gapminder Foundation.

Life expectancy from 1881 to 1950

The population of India under the British Raj (including what are now Pakistan and Bangladesh) according to censuses:

Studies of India's population since 1881 have focused on such topics as total population, birth and death rates, geographic distribution, literacy, the rural and urban divide, cities of a million, and the three cities with populations over eight million: Delhi, Greater Mumbai (Bombay), and Kolkata (Calcutta).

Mortality rates fell in the period 1920–45, primarily due to biological immunisation. Suggestions that it was the benefits of colonialism are refuted by academic thinking: "There can be no serious, informed belief… that… late colonial era mortality diminished and population grew rapidly because of improvements in income, living standards, nutrition, environmental standards, sanitation or health policies, nor was there a cultural transformation…".

Salient features 

India occupies 2.41% of the world's land area but supports over 18% of the world's population. At the 2001 census 72.2% of the population lived in about 638,000 villages and the remaining 27.8% lived in more than 5,100 towns and over 380 urban agglomerations.

India's population exceeded that of the entire continent of Africa by 200 million people in 2010. However, because Africa's population growth is nearly double that of India, it is expected to surpass both China and India by 2025.

Comparative demographics

List of states and union territories by demographics

Religious demographics 

The table below summarises India's demographics (excluding the Mao-Maram, Paomata and Purul subdivisions of Senapati district of Manipur state due to cancellation of census results) according to religion at the 2011 census in per cent. The data are "unadjusted" (without excluding Assam and Jammu and Kashmir); the 1981 census was not conducted in Assam and the 1991 census was not conducted in Jammu and Kashmir. Missing citing/reference for "Changes in religious demagraphics over time" table below.

Characteristics of religious groups

Neonatal and infant demographics 

The table below represents the infant mortality rate trends in India, based on sex, over the last 15 years. In the urban areas of India, average male infant mortality rates are slightly higher than average female infant mortality rates.

Some activists believe India's 2011 census shows a serious decline in the number of girls under the age of seven – activists posit that eight million female fetuses may have been aborted between 2001 and 2011. These claims are controversial. Scientists who study human sex ratios and demographic trends suggest that a birth sex ratio between 1.08 and 1.12 can be due to natural factors, such as the age of mother at the baby's birth, the age of father at conception, number of babies per couple, economic stress, endocrinological factors, and others. The 2011 census birth sex ratio in India, of 917 girls to 1000 boys, is similar to birth sex ratios (870–930 girls to 1000 boys) observed in Japanese, Chinese, Cuban, Filipino and Hawaiian ethnic groups in the United States between 1940 and 2005. They are also similar to birth sex ratios (below 900 girls to 1000 boys) observed in mothers of different age groups and gestation periods in the United States.

Population within the age group of 0–6

Population above the age of seven

Literacy rate

Linguistic demographics 

According to the 2001 census, 41.03% of the Indians spoke Hindi natively, while the rest spoke Assamese, Bengali, Gujarati, Maithili, Kannada, Malayalam, Marathi, Odia, Punjabi, Tamil, Telugu, Urdu and a variety of other languages. There are a total of 122 languages and 234 mother tongues spoken in India. Of these, 22 languages are specified in the Eighth Schedule of Indian Constitution, while 100 are non-specified.

The table below excludes Mao-Maram, Paomata and Purul subdivisions of Senapati District of Manipur state due to cancellation of census results.

Largest cities of India

Vital statistics

UN estimates

Census of India: sample registration system

Life expectancy 

Source: UN World Population Prospects

Structure of the population 

Structure of the population (9 February 2011) (Census) age wise are shown below:

Population Estimates by Sex and Age Group (03.III.2016):

Population Estimates by Sex and Age Group (01.III.2021):

Fertility rate 
From the Demographic Health Survey:

Regional vital statistics

CIA World Factbook demographic statistics 

The following demographic statistics are from the CIA World Factbook, unless otherwise indicated.

Total population

1,166,079,217 (July 2009 est. CIA), 1,210 million (2011 census), 1,389,637,446 (May 2022 est.)

Rural population:

62.2%; male: 381,668,992, female: 360,948,755

Age structure:

0–14 years: 27.34% (male 186,087,665/female 164,398,204)
15–24 years: 17.9% (male 121,879,786/female 107,583,437)
25–54 years: 41.08% (male 271,744,709/female 254,834,569)
55–64 years: 7.45% (male 47,846,122/female 47,632,532)
65+ years: 6.24% (male 37,837,801/female 42,091,086) (2017 est.)

Median age:

Total: 28.7 years

Male: 28 years

female: 29.5 years (2020 est.)

Population growth rate :

0.67% (2022 est)

Literacy rate

74% (age 7 and above, in 2011)
81.4% (total population, age 15–25, in 2006)

Per cent of population below poverty line:

22% (2006 est.)

Unemployment rate:

7.8%

Net migration rate:

0.00 migrant(s)/1,000 population (2020 est.)

Sex ratio:

At birth:
1.12 male(s)/female
Under 10 years:
1.13 male(s)/female
15–24 years:
1.13 male(s)/female
24–64 years:
1.06 male(s)/female
65 years and over:
0.9 male(s)/female
Total population:
1.08 male(s)/female (2017 est.)

Life expectancy at birth:

Total population: 69.7 years
Male: 68.4 years
Female: 71.2 years (2020 est.)

Total fertility rate:

2.35 (2020 est.)

The TFR (total number of children born per women) by religion in 2005–2006 was: Hindus, 2.7; Muslims, 3.1; Christians, 2.4; and Sikhs, 2.0.

Religious Composition:

Hindus 79.5%, Muslims 15%, Christian 2.3%, Sikh 1.7%, other and unspecified 2% (2011 est.)

Scheduled castes and tribes:

Scheduled castes: 16.6% (2011 census);
scheduled tribes: 8.6% (2011 census)

Languages

See Languages of India and List of languages by number of native speakers in India. There are 216 languages with more than 10,000 native speakers in India. The largest of these is Hindi with some 337 million, and the second largest is Bengali with 238 million. 22 languages are recognised as official languages. In India, there are 1,652 languages and dialects in total.

Caste 
Caste and community statistics as recorded from "Socially and Educationally Backward Classes Commission" (SEBC) or Mandal Commission of 1979. This was completed in 1983.

India has chosen not to officially count caste population since then.

The following data are from the Mandal report:

Population projections 
India is projected to overtake China as the world's most populous nation by 2023. These projections make assumptions about future fertility and death rates which may not turn out to be correct in the event. Fertility rates also vary from region to region, with some higher than the national average and some lower than China's.

2020 estimate 
In millions

Ethnic groups 

The national Census of India does not recognise racial or ethnic groups within India, but recognises many of the tribal groups as Scheduled Castes and Tribes (see list of Scheduled Tribes in India).

According to a 2009 study published by Reich et al.., the modern Indian population is composed of two genetically divergent and heterogeneous populations which mixed in ancient times (about 1,200–3,500 BP), known as Ancestral North Indians (ANI) and Ancestral South Indians (ASI). ASI corresponds to the Dravidian-speaking population of southern India, whereas ANI corresponds to the Indo-Aryan-speaking population of northern India. 700,000 people from the United States of any race live in India. Between 300,000 and 1 million Anglo-Indians live in India.

For a list of ethnic groups in the Republic of India (as well as neighbouring countries) see South Asian ethnic groups.

Genetics

Y-chromosome DNA 

Y-Chromosome DNA Y-DNA represents the male lineage, The Indian Y-chromosome pool may be summarised as follows where haplogroups R-M420, H, R2, L and NOP comprise generally more than 80% of the total chromosomes.
 H ~ 30%
 R1a ~ 34%
 R2 ~ 15%
 L ~ 10%
 NOP ~ 10% (Excluding R)
 Other Haplogroups 15%

Mitochondrial DNA 

Mitochondrial DNA mtDNA represents the female lineage. The Indian mitochondrial DNA is primarily made up of Haplogroup M
 Haplogroup M ~ 60%
 Haplogroup UK ~ 15%
 Haplogroup N ~ 25% (Excluding UK)

Autosomal DNA 

Numerous genomic studies have been conducted in the last 15 years to seek insights into India's demographic and cultural diversity. These studies paint a complex and conflicting picture.
 In a 2003 study, Basu, Majumder et al. have concluded on the basis of results obtained from mtDNA, Y-chromosome and autosomal markers that "(1) there is an underlying unity of female lineages in India, indicating that the initial number of female settlers may have been small; (2) the tribal and the caste populations are highly differentiated; (3) the Austroasiatic tribals are the earliest settlers in India, providing support to one anthropological hypothesis while refuting some others; (4) a major wave of humans entered India through the northeast; (5) the Tibeto-Burman tribals share considerable genetic commonalities with the Austroasiatic tribals, supporting the hypothesis that they may have shared a common habitat in southern China, but the two groups of tribals can be differentiated on the basis of Y-chromosomal haplotypes; (6) the Dravidian speaking populations were possibly widespread throughout India but are regulated to South India now; (7) formation of populations by fission that resulted in founder and drift effects have left their imprints on the genetic structures of contemporary populations; (8) the upper castes show closer genetic affinities with Central Asian populations, although those of southern India are more distant than those of northern India; (9) historical gene flow into India has contributed to a considerable obliteration of genetic histories of contemporary populations so that there is at present no clear congruence of genetic and geographical or sociocultural affinities."
 In a later 2010 review article, Majumder affirms some of these conclusions, introduces and revises some other. The ongoing studies, concludes Majumder, suggest India has served as the major early corridor for geographical dispersal of modern humans from out-of-Africa. The archaeological and genetic traces of the earliest settlers in India has not provided any conclusive evidence. The tribal populations of India are older than the non-tribal populations. The autosomal differentiation and genetic diversity within India's caste populations at 0.04 is significantly lower than 0.14 for continental populations and 0.09 for 31 world population sets studied by Watkins et al., suggesting that while tribal populations were differentiated, the differentiation effects within India's caste population was less than previously thought. Majumder also concludes that recent studies suggest India has been a major contributor to the gene pool of southeast Asia.
 Another study covering a large sample of Indian populations allowed Watkins et al. to examine eight Indian caste groups and four endogamous south Indian tribal populations. The Indian castes data show low between-group differences, while the tribal Indian groups show relatively high between-group differentiation. This suggests that people between Indian castes were not reproductively isolated, while Indian tribal populations experienced reproductive isolation and drift. Furthermore, the genetic fixation index data show historical genetic differentiation and segregation between Indian castes population is much smaller than those found in east Asia, Africa and other continental populations; while being similar to the genetic differentiation and segregation observed in European populations.
 In 2006, Sahoo et al. reported their analysis of genomic data on 936 Y-chromosomes representing 32 tribal and 45 caste groups from different regions of India. These scientists find that the haplogroup frequency distribution across the country, between different caste groups, was found to be predominantly driven by geographical, rather than cultural determinants. They conclude there is clear evidence for both large-scale immigration into ancient India of Sino-Tibetan speakers and language change of former Austroasiatic speakers, in the northeast Indian region.
 The genome studies conducted up until 2010 have been on relatively small population sets. Many are from just one southeastern state of Andhra Pradesh (including Telangana, which was part of the state until June 2014). Thus, any conclusions on demographic history of India must be interpreted with caution. A larger national genome study with demographic growth and sex ratio balances may offer further insights on the extent of genetic differentiation and segregation in India over the millenniums.

Charts

See also 

 Census in British India
 Culture of India
 Non-resident Indian and Overseas Citizen of India
 Demographics of Central Asia
 Female foeticide in India
 Missing women
 Hinduism in India
 Jainism in India
 Sikhism in India
 Islam in India
 Christianity in India
Judaism in India
 Zoroastrianism in India
 Irreligion in India

Government 
 2011 Census of India
 National Commission on Population

Lists 
 List of states and union territories of India by fertility rate
 List of states and union territories of India by population
 List of cities in India by population
 List of metropolitan areas in India
 List of million-plus urban agglomerations in India

Notes

References

Bibliography 

 Arnold, David. Pandemic India: From Cholera to Covid-19 (Oxford University Press, 2022) online review
 Chakravorty, Swastika, Srinivas Goli, and Kuriath S. James. "Family demography in India: Emerging patterns and its challenges." Sage Open 11.2 (2021): 21582440211008178. online

.  Joseph Chamie is former director of the United Nations Population Division and Barry Mirkin is former chief of the Population Policy Section of the United Nations Population Division.
 Chandrasekhar, S., and Ajay Sharma. "Urbanization and spatial patterns of internal migration in India." Spatial demography 3.2 (2015): 63-89. online

 Sekher, T. V. "Rural demography of India." in  International handbook of rural demography (Springer, Dordrecht, 2012) pp. 169-189.

 Smith, Robert D., and Mohandas K. Mallath. "History of the growing burden of cancer in India: from antiquity to the 21st century." Journal of Global Oncology 5 (2019): 1-15. online

Medieval India 
Lal, K. S. (1978). Growth of Muslim population in medieval India (A.D. 1000–1800). Delhi, Research Publications.
Lal, K. S. (1995). Growth of scheduled tribes and castes in medieval India. New Delhi: Aditya Prakashan.

External links 

 Census of India; government site with detailed data from 2001 census
 Population of India as per Census India 2011
 Census of India map generator; generates maps based on 2001 census figures
 Demographic data for India; provides sources of demographic data for India
 2001 maps; provides maps of social, economic and demographic data of India in 2001
 Population of India 2011 map; distribution of population amongst states and union territories
 India's Demographic Outlook: Implications and Trends
 "World Population Prospects": Country Profile – India
 Aggregated demographic statistics from Indian and global data sources
 Demographic statistics for India – online on Bluenomics
 India comparing with China population projection graph Based on data from database of UN Population Division

 
Demographic history of India